Basho Sings is the third studio album by composer and guitarist Robbie Basho, released in 1967 by Takoma Records.

Track listing

Personnel
Adapted from the Basho Sings liner notes.
Robbie Basho – vocals, steel-string acoustic guitar
Paul Kagan – photography
Tom Weller – design

Release history

References

External links 
 

1967 albums
Robbie Basho albums
Takoma Records albums